Rio Maior is a municipality in the Santarém District in Portugal. The population in 2011 was 21,192, in an area of 272.76 km².

The present mayor is Isaura Morais of the Social Democratic Party (PSD), the first woman to be elected mayor in the municipality. The municipal holiday is November 6.

Parishes
Administratively, the municipality is divided into ten civil parishes (freguesias):
 Alcobertas
 Arrouquelas
 Asseiceira
 Azambujeira e Malaqueijo
 Fráguas
 Marmeleira e Assentiz
 Outeiro da Cortiçada e Arruda dos Pisões
 Rio Maior
 São João da Ribeira e Ribeira de São João
 São Sebastião

Climate
Rio Maior has a Mediterranean climate with warm to hot, dry summers and mild, wet winters.

Notable people 
 Duarte da Silva Marques (born 1983 in Rio Maior) a triathlete, competed at the 2008 Summer Olympics 
 Pedro Oliveira (born 1988 in Rio Maior) a backstroke and butterfly swimmer, participated in the 2008 & 2012 Summer Olympics
 Miguel Carvalho (born 1994) a racewalker, took part in the 2016 Summer Olympics

References

External links

Town Hall official website
Photos from Rio Maior

 
Cities in Portugal
Populated places in Santarém District
Municipalities of Santarém District